Maurizio Rossi (born in Rome, Italy) is a professional architectural lighting designer based in Rome, Italy. He completed his studies in architectural and building techniques at the ITIS Bernini in Rome, Italy and began his professional career exploring several related fields: architectural and interior design as well as structural calculations.

Early career

When he moved to the United States he applied this experience working with manufacturers  designing office and school furniture at the Herbert L. Farkas Company in New Jersey and at the same time exploring an artistic career with luminous sculptures, using to full advantage  the characteristics of materials like Plexiglas.

Development years
In 1969 Rossi, in New York, met Seymour Evans one of New York's few lighting designers at that time. Evans after reviewing Rossi's professional qualifications, offered him a leading position in his lighting design firm.  At this point, Rossi also began to study and to attend lighting design courses to enhance his qualifications in this new field. Having heard about Rossi's creativity and design capabilities in 1970 Howard Brandston one of the most prominent architectural lighting designers in the United States asked him to join his architectural lighting design firm in New York. At this time that Rossi while directing, among others, the lighting design project for the  São Paulo Hilton in Brazil met and worked closely with Brazilian artist and landscape architect Roberto Burle Marx. In 1972  Brandston and Rossi decided to open a partnership branch of architectural lighting design in  Milan, Italy. In 1975 Rossi was formally accepted as a Corporate Member of the IALD International Association Of Lighting Designers (IALD). During these years Mr. Rossi also taught lighting design at Fairfield University in Fairfield, Connecticut.

Lighting design firm

After moving definitely to Italy, in 1981 Rossi established his own professional firm in Rome, and since then it has produced close to  250 architectural lighting design projects in Italy and abroad.

Rossi, was the first (and still is the only) IALD Italian member and American-trained architectural lighting designer in Italy.

Selected works
 Lex Hyatt Burlington Gardens, London, UK
 LD Café am Kröpcke Restaurants, Hannover, Germany
 Baden Baden Kurhaus Mövenpick, Baden Baden, Germany
 Città della Scienza, Bagnoli, Naples, Italy
 "Convoglia" Cappa Mazzoniana, Termini railway station, Rome, Italy
 Hyatt Caspian Sea Hotel, Caspian Sea, Iran
 Beirut Hilton Hotel, Beirut, Lebanon
 São Paulo Hilton Hotel, São Paulo, Brasil
 Grand Hotel Flora Marriott, Rome, Italy
 Lady Moura Luxury Yacht, Hamburg, Germany
 120 m. Cruise ship, Viareggio, Italy
 Golden Odissey cruise ship, Elsinore, Denmark
 H.R.H. Turk Bin Faisal Al Saud residence, Rome, Italy
 H.R.H. Bendar Bin Faisal Al Saud residence, Rome, Italy
 Iran prime minister villa, Kish Island, Iran

Publications and interviews
 “La Repubblica” – Milano
 “Lighting Academy”   “Convoglia"
 “Mondo Arc” Issue 50
 “Riviste Digitali - Luce & Design"

References

External links
 Official website 

Living people
Artists from Rome
Lighting engineers
Italian designers
Fairfield University faculty
Year of birth missing (living people)